Anil Rao may refer to:

 Anil V. Rao (born 1965), professor of aerospace engineering